Łukasz Tupalski (born September 4, 1980 in Białystok) is a Polish footballer.

Successes 
Dyskobolia Grodzisk Wielkopolski
 1x Polish Cup: 2006/07
 2x Ekstraklasa Cup: 2007, 2008

External links 
 

1980 births
Living people
Polish footballers
Wigry Suwałki players
MKS Cracovia (football) players
Jagiellonia Białystok players
Dyskobolia Grodzisk Wielkopolski players
Górnik Łęczna players
Zawisza Bydgoszcz players
Bruk-Bet Termalica Nieciecza players
Association football defenders
Sportspeople from Białystok